Dobroslav (Cyrillic script: Доброслав) is a Slavic masculine given name which contains two elements: "dobro" - good, goodness and "sława/slava" - glory, fame. The Polish spelling is Dobrosław. Variants include Serbian Dobrosav. The feminine forms are Dobroslava, Dobroslavka, Dobrosława. The name may refer to:

Stefan Vojislav (fl. 1018 - d. 1043), anachronistically called Dobroslav, Prince of the Serbs
Dobroslav II, ruler of Duklja 1101–1102
Dobroslav III, ruler of Duklja in 1102
Dobrosława Bałazy, from Teatr Polskiego Radia
Dobroslav Chrobák, Slovak writer
Dobroslav Jevđević, Bosnian Serb politician and Chetnik commander
Dobrosav Krstić, retired Serbian footballer of the 1950s and 1960s who was very successful with FC Sochaux-Montbéliard in French Division 1
Dobroslav Paraga (9 December 1960), Croatian right-wing politician
Jonatán Dobroslav Čipka, Slovak priest, poet and author
Alexey Dobrovolsky, (also known as Dobroslav; 1938-2013) - Soviet dissident, neo-Nazi, and one of the founders of Russian neo-paganism

See also 

Slavic names
Dobroslav, Ukraine, an urbal locality in Odessa Oblast, Ukraine
Dobroslava, a village and municipality in Svidník District, Slovakia
Dobrosloveni, a commune in Olt County, Romania
Dobroslavtsi, a village in Sofia in western Bulgaria

References

External links 

 

Slavic masculine given names
Bosnian masculine given names
Bulgarian masculine given names
Croatian masculine given names
Czech masculine given names
Macedonian masculine given names
Montenegrin masculine given names
Slovak masculine given names
Slovene masculine given names
Serbian masculine given names
Masculine given names